Werner Lorenz (5 January 1937 – 20 March 2020) was a German ice hockey player. He spent his entire career with Adler Mannheim, from 1952 to 1971.

References

1937 births
2020 deaths
German ice hockey defencemen
Adler Mannheim players
Sportspeople from Ludwigshafen